Rollo Coaster is a wooden roller coaster located at Idlewild and Soak Zone near Ligonier, Pennsylvania, United States of America. It was built in 1938 by the leading roller coaster designer and builder of that era, Philadelphia Toboggan Company. It was Idlewild's first and only roller coaster for decades until the larger Wild Mouse coaster was erected in 1993. The coaster closed in 2016, amidst safety concerns, but was reopened for the 2018 Operation Season.

Built over a hillside at Idlewild Park, the Rollo Coaster is an out and back format. It uses skid brakes operated manually with a lever. The train consists of 4 cars that have 2 rows in 1 car and 1 row in the others. Each row has 2 seats. It was popular with coaster enthusiasts due to its lack of restraints except for a grab bar, until 2018. It is located next to the Carousel and Flying Aces.

While the Rollo Coaster features only small hills, it uses topography to its advantage. Built over steep terrain, the ride features many tight twists and turns which create a rough ride and a sense of much greater speed.

This coaster was the inspiration for Boulder Dash, a similar but much larger coaster at Lake Compounce.

The Rollo Coaster was an ACE Coaster Classic.

Incident
On August 11, 2016, a three-year-old boy was thrown from the Rollo Coaster. The boy sustained injuries and was rushed to a Pittsburgh hospital by helicopter, where he was listed in critical condition with head and chest injuries. The boy was in the hospital for two months before being released. The ride was closed pending an investigation and remained closed for the remainder of the season, and all of the 2017 season. In May 2017, the Pennsylvania Department of Agriculture, Division of Rides and Amusements released its investigative report, detailing how the riders switched seats after ride operators checked them, resulting in the riders not meeting the rider height requirements. In addition, the report noted several instances of excessive wear and movement of the train hitches and tracks, but that it wasn't known whether these factors caused the accident. The report listed several requirements for the ride to be reopened, including the addition of seat belts, a reevaluation of minimum rider height, and a ride evaluation by a Professional Engineer. Based on this report, the state also recommended amusement parks with similar roller coasters voluntarily make take the same actions. Idlewild announced they had procured a new train for the Rollo Coaster, which included seat belts, and that they expected the ride to resume operation for the 2018 season, pending a state inspection.

References

External links
 Idlewild website

Roller coasters in Pennsylvania
Roller coasters introduced in 1938
1938 establishments in Pennsylvania